John Craig Flournoy (born June 26, 1951 in Shreveport, Louisiana, USA) is a journalism professor at the University of Cincinnati and a former investigative reporter for The Dallas Morning News, at which his work included coverage of the latter portion of the civil rights movement.

He has taught since 2014 at Cincinnati. From 2003 to 2013, he taught at Southern Methodist University, where in 1986, he received a Master of Arts degree in history. He formerly taught courses on computer-assisted reporting, investigative reporting, history of American journalism, and communication law briefly at the University of Cincinnati. From 1997 to 1998, while on leave from The Dallas Morning News, he was the Phillip G. Warner Professor of Journalism at Sam Houston State University in Huntsville, Texas.

Education
Flournoy obtained his Bachelor of Arts in history with honors from the University of New Orleans in 1975, his master's in history from SMU in 1986, and his Ph.D. in journalism in 2003 from the Douglas Manship School of Mass Communications at Louisiana State University in Baton Rouge.

Awards and honors
Flournoy has won more than fifty state and national journalism awards, including the Scripps Howard Edward J. Meeman Award for Environmental Reporting and eleven Dallas Club Katie awards, five of which were for investigative reporting.

Family
Flournoy and his wife, Nina P. Flournoy (born June 11, 1954), have three daughters. Mrs. Flournoy is a senior lecturer at Southern Methodist University.

See also
The Houstonian (newspaper)

References

External links
 SMU bio
 UC bio

Living people
1951 births
Pulitzer Prize for National Reporting winners
Writers from Shreveport, Louisiana
Writers from Dallas
People from Huntsville, Texas
Educators from Cincinnati
University of New Orleans alumni
Southern Methodist University alumni
Louisiana State University alumni
Southern Methodist University faculty
Sam Houston State University faculty
University of Cincinnati faculty
Journalists from Ohio
Journalists from Texas
Journalists from Louisiana